The Doraemons is a video game developed by Riverhill Soft and published by Shogakukan for the 3DO.

Gameplay
The Doraemons is a role-playing game intended to be played by young children.

Reception
Next Generation reviewed the 3DO version of the game, rating it 1 star out of five, and stated that "if you're more than seven or eight years old, the game is generally uninvolving."

References

1995 video games
3DO Interactive Multiplayer games
3DO Interactive Multiplayer-only games
Doraemon video games
Japan-exclusive video games
Riverhillsoft games
Role-playing video games
Video games developed in Japan